World Series of Fighting 13: Moraes vs. Bollinger was a mixed martial arts event held  in Bethlehem, Pennsylvania, United States, The event aired on NBCSN.

Background
Marlon Moraes was originally set to make his first title defense against Canadian Josh Hill at this event.  However, Hill was forced out with an injury and was replaced by Cody Bollinger.  With the bout being on such short notice, the fight was announced as a non-title, catchweight bout at 140 lbs.

On the day of the weigh-ins, Bollinger realized that he would not be able to make the 140 lb limit and the catchweight was increased to 147 lbs. Bollinger had a long history of failing to make weight, including being kicked out of the TUF house in UFC for failure to do so. In an interview with Bollinger's trainer during the broadcast, it was revealed that Bollinger weighed 170 lbs just prior to going into the cage with Moraes.

Results

See also 
 World Series of Fighting
 List of WSOF champions
 List of WSOF events

References

World Series of Fighting events
2014 in mixed martial arts